The Guatemala women's national handball team is the national team of Guatemala. It is governed by the Federation National de Balomano de Guatemala and takes part in international handball competitions.

Results

Pan American Championship

Central American and Caribbean Games

Central American Games

Central American Championship

Pan American Games qualification tournaments

External links
IHF profile

Women's national handball teams
Handball
National team